"Years May Come, Years May Go" is a song written by André Popp and Jack Fishman and performed by Herman's Hermits. It reached No. 7 on the UK Singles Chart and No. 31 on the Kent Music Report in 1970.

The song was produced by Mickie Most.

Other versions
The Irish Rovers released a version in 1970 that reached No. 92 on the RPM chart in Canada. It was included on their 1971 album, On the Shores of Americay.

References

1970 songs
1970 singles
Songs written by André Popp
Herman's Hermits songs
Song recordings produced by Mickie Most
Columbia Records singles